The 2012 Harrisburg City Islanders season was the club's ninth season of competitive soccer - its ninth season in the third division of American soccer and its second season in the USL Professional Division; the City Islanders being one of the original 10 founder-members.

City Islanders finished the 2012 USL Pro season by finishing sixth in the table, good enough for a berth into the 2012 USL Pro Playoffs, marking their second-consecutive season of postseason play. However, in the first round, Harrisburg suffered a 2–1 defeat at Charleston Battery thus, ending their postseason ambitions.

Roster 

Source

Transfers

In

Out

Loan in

Competitions

USL Pro

League table

Results
All times in Eastern Time.

Results summary

Playoffs
The City Islanders were beaten in the quarterfinals of the 2012 USL Pro season playoffs by the Charleston Battery. The South Carolina club ran out 2–1 winners and would eventually win the 2012 USL Pro Championship against Wilmington Hammerheads.

U.S. Open Cup 

The Harrisburg City Islanders played one of their best runs in the 2012 U.S. Open Cup being one of three teams from the lower divisions to advanced the furthest in the tournament (to the Quarterfinals). In the process, the City Islanders record wins over two MLS clubs: New England Revolution (in the Third Round) and New York Red Bulls (in the Fourth Round).

They were ultimately knocked out of the tournament in the Quarterfinals by their MLS affiliate, Philadelphia Union.

References 

Penn FC seasons
American soccer clubs 2012 season
2012 USL Pro season
2012 in sports in Pennsylvania